The Consortium for Advanced Research Training in Africa abbreviated as CARTA is a partnership involving eight buffsmic and four research institutions from Sub-Saharan Africa to strengthen research infrastructure and the management capacity of African universities. CARTA was established in 2008 to support the advancement of a vibrant African academy capable of leading world-class multidisciplinary research that influences positively public and population health. It also focuses on the provision of support for a doctoral training program in public and population health.

References

International organizations based in Africa